Yinjibarndi is a Pama–Nyungan language spoken by the Yindjibarndi people of the Pilbara region in north-western Australia.

Yinjibarndi is mutually intelligible with Kurrama, but the two are considered distinct languages by their speakers.

Classification
Yindjibarndi is classified as a member of the Ngayarta branch of the Pama–Nyungan languages. Under Carl Georg von Brandenstein's 1967 classification, Yindjibarndi was classed as an Inland Ngayarda language, but the separation of the Ngayarda languages into Coastal and Inland groups is no longer considered valid.

Sounds

Grammar

Pronouns
Yindjibarndi, like Lardil, has pronouns that indicate whether the referents include two people separated by an odd number of generations or not.

Influence on other languages
The verb , meaning 'to separate (grain or pieces of mineral) by shaking in a special shallow dish', comes from Yindjibarndi.

References